The 1978 NAPA National 500 was a NASCAR Winston Cup Series racing event held on October 8, 1978, at Charlotte Motor Speedway in Concord, North Carolina.

The #96 Ford was qualified and driven by Dale Earnhardt. Baxter Price only started the race to preserve Dale's status as a rookie for 1979 (NASCAR rules allow a driver to make five starts in a previous year).

Background
Charlotte Motor Speedway was designed and built by Bruton Smith and partner and driver Curtis Turner in 1959. The first World 600 NASCAR race was held at the  speedway on June 19, 1960. On December 8, 1961, the speedway filed bankruptcy notice.  Judge J.B. Craven of US District Court for Western North Carolina reorganized it under Chapter 10 of the Bankruptcy Act; Judge Craven appointed Robert "Red" Robinson as the track's trustee until March 1962.  At that point, a committee of major stockholders in the speedway was assembled, headed by A.C. Goines and furniture store owner Richard Howard.   Goines, Howard, and Robinson worked to secure loans and other monies to keep the speedway afloat.

By April 1963 some $750,000 was paid to twenty secured creditors and the track emerged from bankruptcy; Judge Craven appointed Goines as speedway president and Howard as assistant general manager of the speedway, handling its day-to-day operations.  By 1964 Howard become the track's general manager, and on June 1, 1967, the speedway's mortgage was paid in full; a public burning of the mortgage was held at the speedway two weeks later.

Smith departed from the speedway in 1962 to pursue other business interests, primarily in banking and auto dealerships from his new home of Rockford, IL. He became quite successful and began buying out shares of stock in the speedway.  By 1974 Smith was more heavily involved in the speedway, to where Richard Howard by 1975 stated, "I haven't been running the speedway.  It's being run from Illinois." In 1975  Smith had become the majority stockholder, regaining control of its day-to-day operations. Smith hired H.A. "Humpy" Wheeler as general manager in October 1975, and on January 29, 1976, Richard Howard resigned as president and GM of the speedway.

Race report
The race was held on a dry circuit; with no precipitation recorded around the speedway. Glenn Jarrett, the brother of Dale Jarrett, and the son of Ned Jarrett, made his NASCAR Winston Cup Series debut in the race.

40 drivers competed in this 334-lap racing event in front of a live crowd of 80,000 ardent NASCAR followers. Bobby Fisher's problems with his stock car engine on lap 3 would make him the last-place finisher of the day. Butch Mock would become the lowest-finishing driver to complete the entire event; albeit 80 laps behind the competitors in the lead lap. Mock would drive two more career races before sticking to just owning the #75 car.

In his fourth start, Terry Labonte manages to finish outside the top-10 for the first time, thanks to a blown engine on lap 293. Skip Manning returns to the Winston Cup ranks for the first time in seven races after losing his ride in Billy Hagen's #92 to Terry Labonte. Manning did a one-off here in Robert Gee's #8 Autowize Chevrolet but a blown engine very early on sent him to the sidelines and resulted in a bad finish.

Bobby Allison would mark his 50th career victory by defeating Darrell Waltrip after nearly three hours and thirty-two minutes of racing; Allison swept the weekend as he also won the World Service Life 300 Sportsman race. The margin between the victor and the second-place finisher would be slightly more than half a minute. There were 40 changes in the lead position throughout the racing event; with Bobby Allison, Cale Yarborough and Richard Petty dominating a fair amount of these laps. Dick Brooks would develop a problem with his fuel pump on lap 325; preventing him from achieving a "top five" finish.

Everybody in the race seemed to have a fantastic level of performance except for Richard Petty who finished in 27th place after qualifying in top-10.

David Pearson would become the fan favorite for this event; due to him earning his 12th pole position in a row at Charlotte Motor Speedway. Ford and Chevrolet vehicles were used by the majority of the qualifying drivers. All drivers were born in the United States of America. Individual race earnings for each driver ranged from the winner's share of $40,000 ($ when adjusted for inflation) to the last-place finisher's purse of $895 ($ when adjusted for inflation). Total driver earnings handed out by NASCAR officials for this event was finalized at $259,980 ($ when adjusted for inflation).

Qualifying

Top 10 finishers

Standings after the race

References

NAPA National 500
NAPA National 500
NASCAR races at Charlotte Motor Speedway